The Men's -90 kg competition at the 2010 World Judo Championships was held at 10 September at the Yoyogi National Gymnasium in Tokyo, Japan. 59 competitors contested for the medals, being split in 4 Pools where the winner advanced to the medal round.

Pool A

Pool B

Pool C

Pool D

Repechage

Finals

References

 Results

External links
 
 Official Site 

M90
World Judo Championships Men's Middleweight